General elections to the Cortes Generales were held in Spain in 1834. At stake were all 188 seats in the Congress of Deputies.

History
The 1834 elections were the first ones since the 1822, and signaled the return of liberalism to Spain after the absolutist Década Ominosa. The elections were held under the Spanish Royal Statute of 1834, not under a full constitutional system. Only around 18,000 people were allowed to vote, out of a population of 12 million.

Constituencies
A majority voting system was used for the election, with 48 multi-member constituencies and 1 single-member constituency.

Results

References

 Estadísticas históricas de España: siglos XIX-XX.

1834 elections in Spain
1834 in Spain
1834
June 1834 events